Lee Wan-hee  (born 10 July 1987) is a South Korean football player who plays for the Chungju Hummel in K League Challenge.

Career
Lee joined Goyang KB in 2010.

He was selected by FC Anyang in the 2013 K League draft. He moved to Chungju Hummel on loan after a season in Anyang.

References

External links 

1987 births
Living people
South Korean footballers
Association football forwards
Goyang KB Kookmin Bank FC players
FC Anyang players
Chungju Hummel FC players
Korea National League players
K League 2 players